Chongwu Town  is a township-level division of Hui'an County, Quanzhou Prefecture-level city, Fujian Province, China.

Chongwu Town is in the southeastern part of Hui'an County, on a peninsula jutting into Taiwan Strait. The town's historical center, the Old Chongwu Fortress (Chongwu Gu Cheng) is a walled city dating to the late 14th century (Hongwu Emperor's reign; the conventional date is 1384). The traditional Hui'an County vernacular architecture, making heavy use of the local granite, is largely preserved within the walled city.
A large sculpture park is located on the narrow strip south of the fortress, between the city wall and the beach.

A memorial hall and the Chongwu Army temple (解放军庙) on the beach just west of town commemorate an engagement between the PLA infantry and the Nationalist air force that took place here in 1949.

A significant amount of hospitality establishment, from luxury to budget hotels, are located outside the walled city.

Chongwu's eastern peninsula, extending east of central Chongwu into Taiwan Strait, contains a number of fishing and farming villages. Toward the east, the peninsula is split in two by the scenic Ben Ji An Bay. A Neolithic archeological site, Dazuoshan, is found on the "north fork" of the peninsula.

Climate

See also
List of township-level divisions of Fujian

References

Township-level divisions of Fujian